Brian NeSmith is an American technology entrepreneur. He is currently the CEO of Arctic Wolf Networks, a network security startup he founded in 2012. Prior to Arctic Wolf, Brian served as president and CEO of Blue Coat Systems, which he helped take public.

Before Blue Coat, NeSmith had been the CEO at IPSILON Networks, which was acquired by Nokia Telecommunications in early 1998.

NeSmith was also the majority owner and founder of the now defunct FC Gold Pride of Women's Professional Soccer. He founded the club in the spring of 2009 and was a co-owner with his wife Nancy, who held the title of President.

NeSmith graduated from the Massachusetts Institute of Technology in 1984 with a bachelor's degree in electrical engineering. He and his family live in the Austin, Texas area.

External links

 Arctic Wolf Networks
 Blue Coat Management
 FC Gold Pride profile

American technology chief executives
American soccer chairmen and investors
Living people
People from the San Francisco Bay Area
Year of birth missing (living people)